Charles Scudder (July 29, 1864 – January 5, 1939) was an American golfer. He competed in the men's individual event at the 1904 Summer Olympics.

References

External links
 

1864 births
1939 deaths
American male golfers
Amateur golfers
Olympic golfers of the United States
Golfers at the 1904 Summer Olympics
Golfers from St. Louis